Adha may refer to:

Adha (tetragraph)
Eid al-Adha
American Dental Hygienists' Association

See also
 Ada (disambiguation)
 Adah (disambiguation)